Damelin is a private college founded by Benjamin Damelin in 1943. Damelin has 17 campuses in South Africa and is owned by Educor (the Education Investment Corporation Limited) group. Damelin offers degrees, diplomas and other higher qualifications, but is considered a college instead of a university due to the regulations for tertiary institutions in South Africa. Damelin is the oldest and most profitable education subsidiary owned by Educor. By November 2012, over one million students had graduated from Damelin.

Educor is a wholly owned division of A1 Capital, owned by Leo Chetty. It is one of the largest education service providers in Africa.

History

In 1943, Benjamin Damelin established Damelin as a "cramming college for white students". In 1951, Johann Brummer joined Damelin as a teacher, in 1952, becoming a partner and serving as Educor's Executive chairman until his resignation in 1998. One of the key aspects in the development of the Damelin name was initiated in 1952 when Brummer started developing materials for long-distance learning, which later became the Damelin Correspondence College in 1955.

In the early years of the 1960s, Damelin began offering evening classes at what would later become their Johannesburg Campus . In 1968, the Damelin Management School was established and offered education and training to adults for the attainment of Damelin certificates. In the 1970s, many of the prisoners imprisoned on Robben Island were registered as students of Damelin. In 1985, the Damelin Computer School, which only offered part-time programs at the time, was established in Johannesburg.

By 1991, Damelin had started offering contact instruction to University of South Africa students, which had been established for middle-class African students who were unable to gain entry into universities of higher prestige with higher level education. All these programs were coordinated at the same Johannesburg site for many years until 1993, when the Braamfontein Campus was founded. In 1998, the University of Pretoria approached the Damelin Computer School to facilitate the computer training of residential students of the University of Pretoria on their main campus because their IT faculty was better suited to training undergraduates than the University of Pretoria's .

By 2005, Damelin was the only institution in Southern Africa whose Bachelor of Commerce degrees were recognized by the Oxford Brookes University, a university established in 1992. In 2007, Damelin aligned their programs with the National Qualifications Framework (NQF) and by 2008, Damelin was offering more than 200 NQF programs. In 2008, Educor was purchased by National Pride Trading 452 as a going concern and the Milpark Business School started integrating the Damelin School of Banking and Insurance's academic operations as part of their offerings.

In 2013, Pacofs signed a three-year contract with Damelin for the training of audio engineers.

In October 2013, the Damelin Gaborone campus cut its ties with Damelin South Africa and renamed itself. 

From November 2013 as part of an initiative in the South African education sector called Project Athena, the South African telecommunication company Telkom has pledged to give over 40 000 SIM cards to Damelin students over the course of three months. In the next phase of this project, free Wi-Fi access is to be implemented across selected Damelin campuses for students to use.

Accreditation and registration 

In South Africa, institutes providing education are required to obtain accreditation with one of the 33 Education & Training Quality Assurance bodies (ETQAs) which are in turn accredited by the South African Qualifications Authority (SAQA).

Damelin, and its various campuses hold provisional accreditation with Umalusi, the highest possible accreditation obtainable with that particular ETQA.

Damelin is also on the registers of private higher and further education & training providers at South Africa's Department of Higher Education and Training for an extensive list of qualifications.  Damelin, through its international affiliation network, also allows South African based learners a channel with which to obtain qualifications, licenses and certificates conferred by various international organisations.

Mode of delivery 

While other institutions under Educor offer other modes of delivery, (e.g. correspondence), Damelin focuses on the following face-to-face modes:
 Full-time tuition, learners register to study full-time.
 Part-time tuition, where employed individuals take classes after work or on Saturday mornings. 
 Corporate training, where courses, or modules thereof are condensed into full day events spanning a few days or a week.

Qualifications and certificates 

Damelin runs programmes that culminate in a variety of forms of recognition, such as programmes leading to:
 Certificates conferred by Damelin
 Certificates conferred by ETQAs
 Certificates conferred by international institutions
 Certificates recognising achievement for skills based courses which do not fall into the category of a full qualification.

Organisation and administration

Damelin is a subsidiary of Educor and most of the organisational and administrative duties are handled by Educor.

Student life 

Students have access to the College Driver Programme, a programme coordinated on each campus by Damelin and Toyota that allows students to practice their basic parking and driving techniques.

Prospective students have the option to undertake a free career analysis that will assist them in deciding which course and career path is most suitable for them.

Students are legible for a partial bursary based on their cultural, academic or athletic performance in high school as part of the Damelin Achiever Bursary Awards initiative. The discounts are not cumulative and they are granted based on the highest level of achievement of the student. The following table illustrates the extent to which a student's fees may be discounted.

Students who study for the Bachelor of Commerce in Marketing and Business Management, Accounting or Information Management can download course material from Damelin's website.

Students will have free access to Wi-Fi facilities on selected campuses as per the next phase of Project Athena, in which Telkom will provide Wi-Fi infrastructure to campuses.

Campuses

Damelin has 17 campuses across South Africa in various cities, including but not limited to Johannesburg, Port Elizabeth, Pretoria, Cape Town, Durban, Bloemfontein and East London.

All of the current campuses are situated within South Africa's borders in 5 of South Africa's 9 provinces: Eastern Cape, Free State, Gauteng, Kwa-Zulu Natal and Western Cape, the first of which was established in the 1960s in Johannesburg, Gauteng.

Eastern Cape

There are two campuses based in the Eastern Cape. One is based in Port Elizabeth and the other in East London.

The East London campus was established in 1992.

Free State

There is one campus based in the Free State. It is based in Bloemfontein and was founded in 1991. On 2 August 2013, it was announced that the Bloemfontein campus would be relocating to a larger premises. The campus is located on Charlotte Maxeke Street.

Gauteng

There are nine campuses based in Gauteng. These campuses in Gauteng can be located in Benoni, Boksburg, Braamfontein, Bramley, Centurion, Menlyn, Randburg, Pretoria and in the Vaal. Three of these campuses are based in Pretoria.

Damelin's presence in Gauteng is central to its history and operation as one of the first campuses was founded there in the 1960s and their head office relocated to Braamfontein in 1992.

The Benoni campus was founded in 1991 and is located on Princes Avenue.

The Boksburg campus is located in Jacobs Street. It is noted for its social events such as beauty pageants and fun days as well as its social outreach programs. It is also known for quality education. The Boksburg campus is also the first ever tertiary institute in South Africa to establish a bird sanctuary.

The Braamfontein campus was founded in 1993 and is located on the corner of Simmons and De Korte Street. The Braamfontein Campus is also located on an entire block, allowing it to be seen from all angles. It is also within walking distance of a Gautrain station.

The Bramley campus was founded as the Allenby Campus in 1994 by Nick Matzukis, Vivien Keller and Val Bartram. It is located on Glen Road.

The Randburg campus was founded in 1997 and is located on the corner of Malibongwe Drive and Republic Road. It is home to the Randburg Campus Library as well as the Randburg School of Business and Management, which is a member of the One Palmes League as per Eduniversal's rating system. On Wednesday 4 December 2013, the campus proudly received ISO 1900:2008 certification from the South African Bureau of Standards, marking a significant milestone for the entire Damelin education group. The Randburg campus sets the benchmark for the other 16 campuses and it serves 2500 students, making it the largest of the 17 campuses.

The Pretoria City campus was established in 2010 and is located on Thabo Sehume Street.

Kwa-Zulu Natal

There are three campuses based in Kwa-Zulu Natal. The campuses in Kwa-Zulu Natal can be found in Durban and Pietermaritzburg.

The Durban campus was founded in 1966.

The Pietermaritzburg campus was founded in 1991 and is based in the Compen Building on Church Street.

The Durban City campus was established in 2010 and is located on Anton Lembede Street.

The Damelin Overport campus is located on 92 Overport Drive

Western Cape

There are two campuses based in the Western Cape. The campuses in the Western Cape can be located in Cape Town and Mowbray.

A Cape Town campus was founded in 1983.

The Cape Town city campus was established in 2010.

The Mowbray campus is located on Liesbeek Parkway. For mother's day in 2013, Mowbray campus students and staff visited Mowbray Maternity Hospital to spend time with mothers who were in the care of the hospital.

Faculties, departments and schools 
Damelin has various faculties, departments and schools, namely:

Faculty of Commerce, Leisure and Information Technology: The Faculty of Commerce, Leisure and Information Technology specializes in accounting, ICT, and travel and tourism. The qualifications in the Faculty range from certificates to diplomas and Bachelor of Commerce degrees. The Diploma in Information Technology, which carries 360 credits with an NQF rating of 6, is more affordable than similar courses offered by the University of the Witwatersrand, Rhodes University and the University of Pretoria.
Faculty of Management Sciences and Communication: The Faculty of Management Sciences and Communication specializes in various professional fields such as journalism, public relations, human resources management, marketing and business management with various diplomas and a Bachelor of Commerce degree on offer.
Faculty of Creative Arts: The Faculty of Creative Arts specializes in the fields of graphic design, photography and various audio technologies.
School of Business, Management and Corporate Training: The School of Business, Management and Corporate Training caters for students who are interested in studying business related subjects that include courses like general finance and public relations. The School of Business, Management and Corporate Training is one of the best 1000 business schools in the world.
School of Media and Design Technology: The School of Media and Design Technology is the largest full-time school in Damelin with a selection of 13 programmes offered over a range of creative media, design and performing art disciplines. The School of Media and Design Technology offers courses in fashion design, interior design, presenting and digital photography. Sound Engineering is offered as part of the School of Media and Design Technology at the Bramley campus.
School of Information Technology: The School of Information Technology caters for students by providing a variety of computer related programmes to them.
School of Engineering: The School of Engineering offers various qualifications in the field of engineering, including diplomas in chemical engineering, civil engineering, mechanical engineering and electrical engineering.
School of Management and Humanities: The School of Management and Humanities offers diplomas across various disciplines, such as tourism, management and public relations.
School of Leisure and Lifestyle: The School of Leisure and Lifestyle caters to students interested in a wide variety of career paths in various fields, such as game ranging and hotel management.
School of Banking and Insurance: The School of Banking and Insurance, which was founded in 1993 in Johannesburg, is a specialist division of Damelin that deals with banking and insurance as well as other financial professions. The School of Banking and Insurance's courses are offered at the Braamfontein and Pretoria City campuses. The School of Banking and Insurance has been involved in the Adult Basic Education and Training programme which aims to improve the education of adults. In 2008, the Milpark Business School started integrating the operations and academics of The School of Banking and Insurance as part of their offerings.
Department of Business Management: The Department of Business Management specializes in various fields of business and offers a range of certificates in accounting, business management and public administration.
Department of Media and Communication: The Department of Media and Communication offers two certificates specializing in journalism and public relations respectively.
Department of Information Technology: The Department of Information Technology offers a single certificate, specializing in the principles of information technology.
Department of Tourism and Event Management: The Department of Tourism and Event Management offers one qualification: a certificate specializing in travel and tourism.
Centre of Excellence: The Centre of Excellence is a division of Damelin that offers a range of diplomas to prospective students.

Awards and accolades

In 2005 a survey conducted by Markinor amongst a sample of fifty recruitment agents revealed that individuals who studied at Damelin and attained their qualifications there were more likely to be hired than individuals educated elsewhere due to the fact that Damelin's qualifications satisfy both the vocational and the professional requirements of both the marketplace and students.

Damelin's various campuses have varying degrees of the PMR.africa award that serve to recognize the high standard of education offered by the award recipient. On 5 November 2012 the Boksburg campus won the Diamond Arrow award for being the best higher education institution in the whole of Johannesburg. The 2012 PMR.africa Gold Award was given to the Boksburg campus on 3 December 2012 for being the best higher education institution in the Ekurhuleni region. The Cape Town city campus was awarded with a Silver Arrow award on 22 April 2013 for their hard work and excellence in the category "College/Institutions for Higher Education". Damelin Kwa-Zulu Natal (all the Damelin campuses in the province) won a Silver Arrow award in the category "Colleges/Training Institutions" on 14 October 2013.

Community interaction

On 13 February 1997, then South African President Nelson Mandela delivered a speech at the Damelin business college in Johannesburg.

In 2007, Damelin partnered with Ocean Experience to promote the safe use of oceans.

Since 2009, Damelin has been the title sponsor for the annual Damelin Rugby Night Series, which is a high school rugby tournament for boys' teams.

Damelin is known for giving away many bursaries to members of the public.

In March 2013, hundreds of students from the Durban City campus took to the streets to express their support against rape and violence against women.

Notable people

Faculty and staff

Frederick John Harris, South African executed for anti-apartheid bombing, lecturer at the Johannesburg campus prior to his death in 1965.
Themba Maseko, managing director of Damelin from 2000 to 2001.
Mark Pilgrim, television presenter and lecturer at the Johannesburg and Centurion sites for the Television Course.

Alumni

Lionel Abrahams, late South African novelist, poet, editor, critic, essayist and publisher.
John Antonakis, Professor, Faculty of Business and Economics, University of Lausanne, Switzerland, author.
Michael Kitso Dingake, member of the ANC, SACP and MK, author and columnist.
Nicole Flint, Miss South Africa 2009 and television/radio personality.
Basetsana Kumalo, Chair & CEO of Basetsana Woman Investment Holdings.
Mninwa Mahlangu, Chairperson for the National Council of Provinces and ANC politician.
Tim Modise, South African journalist, TV and radio presenter for SAfm.
David Nosworthy former South African international cricketer.
Cyril Ramaphosa, ANC politician, 5th president of South Africa.
Clive Rice, former South African international cricketer.
Solly Shoke, general of the South African Army and chief of the South African National Defence Force.

Controversy

On 9 September 2012, the investigative journalism program Carte Blanche aired a feature called "Arrested Development" in which the legitimacy of Damelin's qualifications was questioned. Damelin was quick to set the record straight and address the issue and even Debora Patta was quoted as saying "Damelin has a good name and is a trusted brand."

References

External links

Damelin Sucks Complaints
Educor's official site
Damelin TV Advert

 
Higher education in South Africa
Educational institutions established in 1943
Colleges in South Africa
1943 establishments in South Africa